Englerodendron lebrunii is a species of tree in the family Fabaceae. It is found only in Democratic Republic of the Congo. It is threatened by habitat loss.

References

lebrunii
Trees of the Democratic Republic of the Congo
Vulnerable plants